Yu Hanaguruma is a Japanese swimmer. He participated at the 2018 Summer Youth Olympics in the swimming competition, being awarded the bronze and gold medal in the boys' 200 metre breaststroke and mixed 4 × 100 metre medley relay events. Hanaguruma also participated at the 2022 World Aquatics Championships in the swimming competition, being awarded the silver medal in the men's 200 metre breaststroke event.

References

External links 

Living people
Place of birth missing (living people)
Year of birth missing (living people)
Japanese male breaststroke swimmers
Swimmers at the 2018 Summer Youth Olympics
Medalists at the 2018 Summer Youth Olympics
Youth Olympic gold medalists for Japan
World Aquatics Championships medalists in swimming
21st-century Japanese people